Myopites tenellus is a species of tephritid or fruit flies in the genus Myopites of the family Tephritidae.

Distribution
Belgium, France, Austria, Hungary, Ukraine, South West Russia.

References

Tephritinae
Insects described in 1863
Diptera of Europe